Oleh Horin (born 2 February 2000) is a professional Ukrainian footballer who plays as a midfielder who plays for FC Mynai.

Career
Horin is a product of the FC Karpaty and FC Lviv youth sportive school systems.

He spent his career as a player for FC Veres Rivne and FC Lviv in the Ukrainian Premier League Reserves and in July 2019, he signed a 4 year contract with Polish Ekstraklasa side Jagiellonia Białystok. 

On 8 November 2019, he made a debut for Jagiellonia in a losing match against Piast Gliwice as a second-half substituted player.

References

External links

2000 births
Living people
Ukrainian footballers
NK Veres Rivne players
FC Lviv players
Jagiellonia Białystok players
FC Mynai players
Ekstraklasa players
Ukrainian expatriate footballers
Expatriate footballers in Poland
Ukrainian expatriate sportspeople in Poland
Association football midfielders
Ukraine youth international footballers
Ukrainian Premier League players